Tepuia is a genus of flowering plants belonging to the family Ericaceae.

Its native range is Venezuela.

Species:
 Tepuia cardonae A.C.Sm. 
 Tepuia intermedia Steyerm.

References

Vaccinioideae
Ericaceae genera
Flora of the Tepuis